Bernard Lacombe (born 15 August 1952) is a French former professional footballer. He played as a striker, mainly with Lyon, Bordeaux and Saint-Étienne and the France national team.

Career
Lacombe began his professional career with hometown club Lyon in 1969. One of his teammates, Aimé Jacquet, would be later his team manager (and the manager of the France national team which won the 1998 FIFA World Cup).

Lacombe earned his first cap for France in 1973. He went on to represent his nation at the 1978 World Cup, scoring after only 30 seconds against Italy, the fastest goal ever for a French player, and also the first goal of that tournament. Lacombe also played at the 1982 World Cup and won UEFA Euro 1984.

After a brief stay with Saint-Étienne, Lacombe joined Bordeaux, where he was re-united with Aimé Jacquet. He won three French Ligue 1 championships. Lacombe won the Coupe de France twice (with Lyon and Bordeaux), and scored a goal in the 1973 Coupe de France Final.

With 255 goals scored in Ligue 1, he is the second-best striker of all-time in the French championship, after Delio Onnis.

After his playing career ended, Lacombe joined the technical staff of former club Lyon, first as technical manager (from 1988 to 1996), then as trainer (1996 to 2000) and manager. He was instrumental in the successes of the club in Ligue 1 and also on the European scene, helping lead his side to seven-straight UEFA Champions League appearances. Lacombe served as a "special adviser" to team president Jean-Michel Aulas for twenty years. He also had significant influence on choices made; for example, he helped retain several Brazilian players who would join Lyon during the 2000s, including Juninho, Edmílson, Cris, Caçapa and Fred).

Career statistics

Club

International

Honours

Player
Lyon
Coupe de France: 1972–73
Trophée des Champions: 1973

Bordeaux
Division 1: 1983–84, 1984–85, 1986–87
Coupe de France: 1985–86, 1986–87
Trophée des Champions: 1987

France
UEFA European Championship: 1984

Manager
Lyon
UEFA Intertoto Cup: 1997

References

External links

1952 births
Footballers from Lyon
Living people
French footballers
France international footballers
Olympique Lyonnais players
AS Saint-Étienne players
FC Girondins de Bordeaux players
Ligue 1 players
1978 FIFA World Cup players
1982 FIFA World Cup players
UEFA Euro 1984 players
UEFA European Championship-winning players
French football managers
Olympique Lyonnais managers
Ligue 1 managers
Association football forwards